Thaumasiomyces is a genus of fungi in the family Ceratomycetaceae.

References

External links
Index Fungorum

Laboulbeniomycetes